Neostygia  is a monotypic genus on the family Cossidae (subfamily Stygiinae ) (type species: Neostygia postaurantia  Wiltshire, 1980 J. Oman Stud. Spec. Rep. 2: 190, pl.: fig. 1).

References

Natural History Museum Lepidoptera generic names catalog
  1980b. The larger moths of Dhofar and their zoogeographic composition. - Journal of Oman Studies Special Rep., 2: 187–216.

)

Stygiinae
Monotypic moth genera